Tinissa polystacta is a moth of the family Tineidae. It was described by Edward Meyrick in 1918. It is found in South Africa.

References

Endemic moths of South Africa
Moths described in 1918
Scardiinae
Moths of Africa